Zale bethunei, or Bethune's zale, is a species of moth in the family Erebidae first described by Smith in 1908. It is found in North America.

The Moths of North America (MONA) (aka Hodges number) for Zale bethunei is 8705.

References

Further reading

 
 
 

Omopterini
Articles created by Qbugbot
Moths described in 1908